Cocconerion is a genus of plants under the family Euphorbiaceae first described as a genus in 1873. The entire genus is endemic to New Caledonia and is related to Baloghia.

Species
 Cocconerion balansae Baill. - SE New Caledonia
 Cocconerion minus Baill. - New Caledonia, Loyalty Islands

References 

Euphorbiaceae genera
Crotonoideae
Endemic flora of New Caledonia
Taxa named by Henri Ernest Baillon